Carolyn Hamilton is a South African anthropologist and historian who is a specialist in the history and uses of archives. She is National Research Foundation of South Africa chair in archive and public culture at the University of Cape Town.

Career
Hamilton was a professor of anthropology at the University of Witwatersrand. She was a member of the board of the South African History Archive and the inaugural Council of Robben Island. She was a founder member of the Gay and Lesbian Archive. She is a former speech-writer for Nelson Mandela and joined the Nelson Mandela Foundation's board of trustees in 2015. Currently, Hamilton is National Research Foundation of South Africa chair in archive and public culture at the University of Cape Town.

Research
Hamilton's research interests lie in the use of archives following graduate work she did in the 1980s that alerted her to issues relating to the reliability, completeness and objectivity of archival sources in South Africa.

Writing
Hamilton's 1998 book, Terrific majesty: The powers of Shaka Zulu and the limits of invention, dealt with the historiography of a particular episode in South African history. She was the editor, with Bernard K. Mbenga and Robert Rossof, of the first volume of The Cambridge History of South Africa (2009).

Selected publications
 In the tracks of the Swazi past : a historical tour of the Ngwane and Ndwandwe kingdoms / compiled by Michael Westcott for the Swaziland Oral History Project. Macmillan Boleswa, Manzini, 1992. (Editor) 
 The Mfecane aftermath: Reconstructive debates in South African history. Witwatersrand University Press, 1995. (Editor) 
 Terrific majesty: The powers of Shaka Zulu and the limits of invention. Harvard University Press, Cambridge, Mass., 1998. 
 Refiguring the archive. Springer, Dordrecht, 2002. (Joint editor) 
 The Cambridge History of South Africa Volume 1: From early times to 1885. Cambridge University Press, Cambridge, 2009. (Editor With Bernard K. Mbenga and Robert Rossof) 
 Uncertain Curature: In and Out of the Archive. Jacana Media, Johannesburg, 2014. (Editor with Pippa Skotnes)

See also 
 Club of Rome

References 

Living people
20th-century South African historians
South African anthropologists
South African women anthropologists
Academic staff of the University of Cape Town
Year of birth missing (living people)
Academic staff of the University of the Witwatersrand
Historians of South Africa
Johns Hopkins University alumni
University of the Witwatersrand alumni
21st-century South African historians